Matthews Hall may refer to:

Canada
Matthews Hall (London, Ontario), a Canadian Accredited Independent School

United States
Matthews Hall (Colorado), Episcopal divinity school in Golden City, Colorado 1872–1878
Matthews Hall (Harvard University), in Massachusetts
Matthews Hall (Tempe, Arizona), listed on the NRHP in Maricopa County, Arizona

See also
Matthew Hall (disambiguation)